Pías Airport  is an airport serving the village of Pías in the La Libertad Region of Peru. The runway is on the banks of the Parcoy River and in a deep canyon with high terrain in all quadrants.

Pías Airport also serves the upstream mining operations of Consorcio Minero Horizonte S.A.

See also

Transport in Peru
List of airports in Peru

References

External links
OpenStreetMap - Pías Airport
OurAirports - Pías
SkyVector - Pías
Pías Airport

Airports in Peru
Buildings and structures in La Libertad Region